Borov Kamak ("Pine Stone") is a waterfall in the Vratsa mountain, western Balkan Mountains, Bulgaria. The waterfall is situated on one the tributaries of the river Leva which flows through Vratsa. It is located on the territory of Vrachanski Balkan Nature Park.

Waterfalls of Bulgaria
Balkan mountains
Landforms of Vratsa Province
Vratsa